Visitors to Angola must obtain either a visa in advance from one of the Angolan diplomatic missions or a pre-visa online, unless they come from one of the visa exempt countries.

A tourist visa must be used within 60 days from the issue date and is valid for 30 days, a period that can be extended once for an additional period of 30 days. Passports must have a validity of 9 months and at least 2 blank pages. Transit without visa is allowed for passengers continuing their trip to a third country by the same or first departing plane if they do not leave the airport.

In the future, Angola is expected to participate in the KAZA UniVisa programme, which if delivered as planned will allow holders of the KAZA visa to travel freely between Angola, Botswana, Namibia, Zambia, and Zimbabwe.

Visa policy map

Visa exemption

Indefinite stay

30 days
Citizens of the following 10 countries can visit Angola without a visa, for up to 30 days per visit. According to Timatic, citizens of these countries are limited to three visa-free entries per year.

Diplomatic and official passports
In addition, holders of diplomatic or official passports of the following countries can also visit Angola without a visa:

Visa waiver agreements for diplomatic and service passports were signed with 
 and  signed an agreement of abolishing visas for diplomatic and service passports on 28th of March 2022.

Simplified visa issuance

Since 30 March 2018, Angola began issuing tourist visas valid for 30 days in a simplified procedure to visitors from 61 countries. Visitors must first apply for a pre-visa online with the Migration and Foreigners Service. After the pre-visa is granted, they can then obtain a visa on arrival at the following designated ports of entry. Visa fee is US$120. In order to obtain a pre-visa, applicants must submit proof of accommodation and subsistence means, a return ticket and the International Certificate of Vaccination.

List of ports:
Quatro de Fevereiro Airport (Luanda)
Lubango Airport
Massabi (Republic of the Congo border)
Luau (Democratic Republic of the Congo border)
Curoca (Namibia border)

Nationals of the following 61 countries are eligible:

Transit
Passengers with a confirmed onward ticket for a flight to a third country within 24 hours. They must stay in the international transit area of the airport and have the documents required for their next destination.

COVID-19 pandemic
During the COVID-19 pandemic, entry was prohibited for persons who had previously visited China, Iran, Italy or South Korea.

Visitor statistics
Most visitors arriving to Angola for tourism purpose were nationals from the following countries:

See also

Visa requirements for Angolan citizens

References

Angola
Foreign relations of Angola